The sport of association football in the country of Saint Lucia is run by the Saint Lucia Football Association. The association administers the national football team, as well as the SLFA First Division.

References